Foot In Mouth Disease is the fourth studio album by Canadian punk rock band Gob, released on April 1, 2003 in Canada by Nettwerk, internationally by Arista Records, and in Japan by BMG. Four singles were released from the album: "Give Up the Grudge", "Oh! Ellin", "Ming Tran" (which previously appeared on the F.U. EP), and "This Evil World".

Three of the album's tracks have been featured in many Electronic Arts video games. The album's second track "I've Been Up These Steps" was in NHL 2003, "Oh! Ellin" was in NHL 2004, and "Give Up the Grudge" was in Madden NFL 2004 and the 2003 film American Wedding.

It is the band’s final album with longtime bassist Craig Wood, as he left the band in 2004.

The song "Ming Tran" was featured in the Being Ian episode, "Band 'o' Bruthaz", which features Gob as guest stars.

Track listing 
 "Lemon-Aid" – 2:45
 "I've Been Up These Steps" – 2:48
 "Oh! Ellin" – 3:59
 "I Cut Myself, Too" – 3:13
 "Fed Up" – 4:18
 "Ming Tran" – 2:34
 "When Life Gets Boring..." – 3:06
 "Give Up the Grudge" – 2:57
 "Bones" – 2:12
 "This Evil World" - 3:22
 "I Hear You Calling" (American Edition Only) – 3:10
 "Bully" – 3:31
 "Cold Feet" – 2:48
 "Everybody's Getting Hooked Up" – 3:23

Japanese bonus tracks
 "My New Favorite Shoplifter" – 3:00
 "Heavy Metal Shuffle" (Kick Axe Cover) – 2:55

Bonus DVD
Audio Tracks
 What To Do
 Beauville
 L.A. Song
 For The Moment
 Sick With You
 No Regrets
 On These Days...
 Soda
 Marching Song
 Marching Song (Pointed Sticks)
 Custers Last 1 Nite Stand (live)
 Heavy Metal Shuffle
 Self Appointed Leader

Videos from The World According to Gob
I Hear You Calling
For The Moment
No Regrets

Band
 Theo Goutzinakis - Backing vocals (lead vocals on "Bully"), guitar
 Tom Thacker - Lead vocals (backing vocals on "Bully"), guitar
 Craig Wood - Bass, vocals
 Gabe Mantle - Drums, vocals

Charts

References

2003 albums
Gob (band) albums
Arista Records albums
Albums produced by Mark Trombino